Shirley Armstrong-Duffy (14 August 1930 – 21 December 2018) was an Irish fencer. She competed in the women's individual foil event at the 1960 Summer Olympics for the Republic of Ireland.

Biography
Armstrong married Irish fencer, Patrick Joseph Duffy who founded The Irish Academy of Arms (Academie d'Armes d'Irlande) in 1952  as well as the highly successful club - Salle Duffy. They helped to build it into a club which dominated fencing in Ireland and became one of the premier clubs in the country. In 1958, they were both heavily involved in the re-establishment of the International Academy of Fencing Masters. Both coached in the fencing clubs at University College Dublin, Royal College of Surgeons and Trinity College Dublin. as well as St Conleth's College, St Killian's School, Wesley College, Sandford Park School, Sutton Park School, St Gerard's School and many other schools in Dublin. For the 1960 Summer Olympics, Armstrong was one of only two women selected to take part, the second was Maeve Kyle.

Armstrong died on 21 December 2018, in Roscommon University Hospital.

References

External links
 

1930 births
2018 deaths
Irish female foil fencers
Olympic fencers of Ireland
Fencers at the 1960 Summer Olympics
People from Antrim, County Antrim
20th-century Irish women